Pupyshevo is a rural locality (a village) in Nezhneyerogodskoye Rural Settlement, Velikoustyugsky District, Vologda Oblast, Russia. The population was 5 as of 2002.

Geography 
Pupyshevo is located 29 km southwest of Veliky Ustyug (the district's administrative centre) by road. Zaruchevye is the nearest rural locality.

References 

Rural localities in Velikoustyugsky District